Acilepis ornata is a species of plant and native to India. The species was first described by William Alexander Talbot in 1898 as Vernonia ornata. (It is not the same species as Vernonia ornata S.Moore.)

References 

Vernonieae
Flora of India (region)